Rhaebobates is a genus of spiders in the family Thomisidae. It was first described in 1881 by Tamerlan Thorell. , it contains 2 species, both from New Guinea.

References

Thomisidae
Thomisidae genera
Spiders of Oceania
Endemic fauna of New Guinea
Taxa named by Tamerlan Thorell